Juyubit (also, Jujubit) was one of the largest villages of the Tongva people. The village was located at the foot of the West Coyote Hills at the confluence of the Coyote and La Cañada Verde creeks, in present-day Buena Park and Cerritos. It was one of the largest villages in Tovaangar. Alternate names of the village include: Jujubit, Jutucubit, Jutucuvit, Jutubit, Jutucunga, Utucubit, Otocubit, Uchubit, Ychubit, and Uchunga.

Colonization 
Records from the San Fernando and San Gabriel missions record 347 baptisms from Juyubit between 1774 and 1804. However, because of incorrect and/or inaccurate village naming records, more Juyubit villagers may have been baptized at these missions. Villagers from involved in the 1785 revolt on Mission San Gabriel led by Toypurina, a medicine woman from the village of Jaichivit.

One woman from Juyubit, Eulalia María, was baptized at the age of six and became a godmother as an adult. She died in 1818. 

By 1840, much of Juyubit's population was absorbed into Missions San Juan Capistrano and San Gabriel.

Legacy 
Versions of Juyubit are mentioned in the narrative legend of the late 18th—early 19th century Tongvan heroine Toypurina.

References

See also
Toypurina
Gabrielino traditional narratives
Zorro, novel by Isabel Allende with Toypurnia
Tongva language

Former Native American populated places in California
Former populated places in California
Former settlements in Los Angeles County, California
San Gabriel Valley
Native American populated places
Tongva populated places
Serrano populated places